Beverly G. Boswell is an American Republican politician. She was the representative for the 6th district of the North Carolina House of Representatives, but lost a Republican primary challenge to Bobby Hanig in 2018. Boswell, a phlebotomist, was criticized after the North Carolina Board of Nursing asked her to stop referring to herself as a nurse on the internet.

References

External links
State House webpage

Living people
Republican Party members of the North Carolina House of Representatives
Women state legislators in North Carolina
Year of birth missing (living people)
21st-century American women